Kramsk  is a village in Konin County, in west-central Poland. It is the seat of the gmina (administrative district) called Gmina Kramsk.

The village has a population of 1,200.

References

Kramsk